Cécilia Cara (born 5 June 1984) is a French actress and singer. She is best known for playing the role of Juliet in the French musical "Romeo and Juliet".

Early life
Cécilia was born in Cannes, on the French Riviera. Cécilia started learning ballet at the age of 3, and at the age of 5 she began singing in the school choir and soon proved to be very gifted and talented. Thanks to different shows and singing contests, she improved her voice and progressively gained self-confidence.

Career
For two years in a row, she won first prize in a contest in Nice.  She became very popular in her region and she soon gained popularity all over France with a TV show launching young artists.  She finally came in 4th out of 500 candidates.  Around the same time, a new musical was being born in France "Roméo et Juliette, de la Haine à l'Amour".  The TV show's presenter immediately contacted the producers to introduce her.  Almost at once, they knew they had found their Juliette.  Cécilia was 16 when she debuted as Juliette in January 2001.

She can speak French, Spanish, English, and Italian.

During her time in "Roméo & Juliette", she recorded duets with French recording artist Florent Pagny (L’air du Temps), as well as former Boyzone member Ronan Keating (Je T’aime Plus Que Tout).

Since being in "Romeo & Juliette", Cécilia has recorded a duet with fellow "Roméo & Juliette" star, Grégori Baquet, for his album (On se Mesure).  She can also be heard doing back-up vocals on Grégori's first single "Donne-moi".  In 2003, Cécilia released "Le Dernier Reflet", the first single off her up-coming album.  The next single that is planned to be released is "Dites Lui".  The album release date is still to be determined.

Cécilia is also pursuing her acting career in films.  Her first feature role was as Alice in the French movie "Le Carton".  She recently finished a movie-short called "Droit au cœur", in which she plays the lead role of a Love Angel named Jasmine who falls in love with a young man on earth.  Cécilia was also given the task in 2004 of vocally dubbing the role Christine Daaé for the French cinema release of Andrew Lloyd Webber's musical "The Phantom of the Opera".

Recently, Cécilia has been touring France raising awareness for multiple sclerosis, along with other former "Romeo & Juliette" performers and other well known French performers.

Cécilia Cara will be performing the role of "Sandy" in Grease in Paris starting 8 October 2008.

Cécilia was in a relationship with Arthur Jugnot from 2006 to 2015. They have a son Céléstin, (born 28 March 2013).

Filmography
 Roméo et Juliette, de la Haine à l'Amour (Juliette Capulet)
 Le Carton (Alice)
 Droit au cœur (Jasmine)
 Andrew Lloyd Webber's Le Fantôme de L'Opéra (voice of Christine Daaé)
 Joséphine, ange gardien TV Series (1 Episode : "Chasse aux fantômes") (2010)

Discography

Albums
 Noël ensemble (Compilation. She sings in "Noël ensemble" and "Ava Maria")
 Roméo et Juliette: de la Haine à l'Amour (Highlights)
 Roméo et Juliette: de la Haine à l'Amour (L’Integrale)
 Roméo et Juliette: de la Haine à l'Amour (En Live)

Singles
 Aimer
 Les Rois du Monde (B-Side "Un Jour")
 Vérone (B-Side "L'Amour Heureux")
 Avoir une Fille (B-Side "La Mort de Juliette")
 Comment Lui Dire (B-Side "Pourquoi?" live)
 L’air du Temps (Duet with Florent Pagny) 
 Je T’aime Plus Que Tout (Duet with Ronan Keating)
 Donne-Moi (Back-up vocals)
 Le Dernier Reflet (B-Side "Et Je Danse")
 Paris-Bogota
 Me Acerco a Tu Boca (Steed Watt Remix)

References

External links

 
 Official Website

1984 births
Living people
French film actresses
French women singers
People from Cannes
21st-century French actresses
French musical theatre actresses